Dabney Crossroads is an unincorporated community in Hinds County, Mississippi, United States.

References

Unincorporated communities in Hinds County, Mississippi
Unincorporated communities in Mississippi